Gruver is a city in Hansford County, Texas, United States. The population was 1,162 at the 2010 census. Farwell, in the center of Hansford County about 3 miles east of what became Gruver, was established in 1880 by the Canott family of Illinois, and was the first town in the county. Gruver was established shortly after, and Farwell rapidly fell into oblivion after 1889, when it lost a county seat election to Hansford.

Geography

Gruver is located at  (36.262731, –101.405143).

Demographics

2020 census

As of the 2020 United States census, there were 1,130 people, 412 households, and 294 families residing in the city.

2000 census
At the 2000 census, 1,162 people, 439 households and 327 families resided in the city. The population density was 1,089.0 per square mile (419.3/km). The 509 housing units averaged 477.0/sq mi (183.7/km). The racial makeup of the city was 80.12% White, 0.69% Native American, 17.21% from other races, and 1.98% from two or more races. Hispanics or Latinos of any race were 28.31% of the population.

Of the 439 households, 39.9% had children under the age of 18 living with them, 64.9% were married couples living together, 5.7% had a female householder with no husband present, and 25.3% were not families. About 23.9% of all households were made up of individuals, and 12.8% had someone living alone who was 65 years of age or older. The average household size was 2.65 and the average family size was 3.15.

The population was distributed as 31.3%  under the age of 18, 6.5% from 18 to 24, 27.0% from 25 to 44, 20.2% from 45 to 64, and 15.0% who were 65 years of age or older. The median age was 35 years. For every 100 females, there were 100.3 males. For every 100 females age 18 and over, there were 99.0 males.

The median household income was $32,031 and the median family income was $37,333. Males had a median income of $26,375 versus $17,143 for females. The per capita income for the city was $18,408. About 12.2% of families and 16.2% of the population were below the poverty line, including 21.5% of those under age 18 and 16.2% of those age 65 or over.

Education
The City of Gruver is served by the Gruver Independent School District and is the location of Gruver High School.

Tornado
On June 9, 1971, the largest observed tornado in history as of that time occurred just to the west-southwest of Gruver.  Since then, it has been bested by a 2004 tornado in Hallam, Nebraska, and the May 2013 tornado in El Reno, Oklahoma. The average width of the tornado along its path is estimated at 2,500 yards and the maximum width was about 2 miles along its 15-mile path.  The tornado moved very slowly.  Visibility was clear and witnesses reported seeing the tornado from as far as 25 miles away. The tornado was reported to have been on a direct track for the City of Gruver, but veered away and spared the town from its effects.  In spite of the size of the tornado, damage was minor; total property damage from the tornado was put at $15,000.  However, the tornado was accompanied by 1- to 2-inch hail that did significant damage to the wheat crops near the path of the tornado.

Climate
According to the Köppen climate classification system, Gruver has a semiarid climate, BSk on climate maps.

References

External links
 Gruver.net
 

Cities in Texas
Cities in Hansford County, Texas